Government Polytechnic For Women, Hindupur (GPW Hindupur) is a polytechnic college offering diploma courses only for women with hostel facility. Situated at Hindupur, Anantapur District, Andhra Pradesh, it was established in 1985. Recently, the  government of Andhra Pradesh granted SDC (SKILL DEVELOPMENT CENTRE) having many training programmes like progecad etc.

Campus details 
GPW Hindupur is situated near guddam temple, sreekantapuram in Hindupur. The institute is an old building with ample greenery.
The Institute offers three diploma courses in electronics and communication (DECE), Civil (DCE) and Pharmacy, all of them are govt-aided courses. In addition to these, institute also offers some vocational courses. All the courses are provided with well furnished classrooms and respective laboratories. Apart from that, there are drawing halls, seminar halls with projectors etc.

GPW Hindupur also provides hostel facility with two buildings. The new hostel building was inaugurated by Nandamuri Balakrishna MLA of Hindupur in 2016.

Education 
GPW Hindupur is under State Board of Technical Education & Training, Andhra Pradesh and All India Council for Technical Education approved. The diploma is a three-year course with a huge demand  and the GPW Hindupur fee structure is as per government norms. The students are admitted through AP POLYCET entrance exam and seats are allotted through AP POLYCET counselling. GPW Hindupur also accepts spot admissions for the left over seats from the counselling.

Campus Activities

Cultural activities are conducted in the second semester of the year for annual college day function. Various sports and games are also held within the campus ground and the institute actively takes part in Inter Polytechnic Sports and Games Meet (IPSGM) every year.

Related External links 
  POLYCET
  SBTET AP
  AICTE
  GPW Hindupur WIKIMAPIA
  GPW Hindupur

References 

Educational institutions established in 1985
1985 establishments in Andhra Pradesh
Engineering colleges in Andhra Pradesh
Universities and colleges in Anantapur district